Pak Datacom is a Pakistani company which provides telecommunication services.

It is listed on the Pakistan Stock Exchange.

History
The company was incorporated as a private limited company in July 1992 but later converted into a public limited company in June 1994.

In 2012, Pak Datacom's CEO, Salman Elahi Malik, was removed from the office for corruption.

Ownership
The Telecom Foundation owns 55% shares which works under the Ministry of Information Technology. While other 45% is owned by foreign and private investors.

References

Telecommunications companies of Pakistan
Telecommunications companies established in 1992
1992 establishments in Pakistan
Companies based in Islamabad
Companies listed on the Pakistan Stock Exchange
Government-owned companies of Pakistan